The 17th National Hockey League All-Star Game took place at Maple Leaf Gardens on October 5, 1963. The hometown Toronto Maple Leafs tied the NHL all-stars 3–3.

The game

Frank Mahovlich scored twice and assisted once, each time giving Toronto a one-goal lead, but, each time, the All-Stars responded to even the score. Mahovlich was named MVP of the game. 
Gordie Howe became the all-time All-Star game points leader when he assisted on Henri Richard's goal in the first period. His ten points put him one up on Maurice Richard.

Game summary

Referee: Frank Udvari
Linesmen: Matt Pavelich and Neil Armstrong
Attendance: 14,034

References 

National Hockey League All-Star Games
All-Star Game
1963
Ice hockey competitions in Toronto
October 1963 sports events in Canada
1963 in Toronto